Oberes Sprottental is a Verwaltungsgemeinschaft ("collective municipality") in the district Altenburger Land, in Thuringia, Germany. The seat of the Verwaltungsgemeinschaft is in Nöbdenitz, which is part of the town Schmölln.

The Verwaltungsgemeinschaft Oberes Sprottental consists of the following municipalities:

Heukewalde
Jonaswalde
Löbichau
Posterstein
Thonhausen
Vollmershain

References

Verwaltungsgemeinschaften in Thuringia